is located in the Hidaka Mountains, Hokkaidō, Japan. The name is derived from Ainu languages which means "the mountain which bears/gods tumble down." Climbers generally abbreviate it as Kamueku.

The mountain is situated in the Hidaka-sanmyaku Erimo Quasi-National Park, and Triangulation station has been set up in the peak by Masaki Terunobu (正木照信) in 1900.

Etymology 
The name is derived from Ainu languages which means "the mountain which bears/gods tumble down." However Ainu people who worship bears as gods are not the one who gave it the name. Originally the mountain was called Satsunai mountain (札内岳). At that time a guide mistakingly told them the name of place as the mountain where they were, and thus the name has been stuck.

Geography
As the name indicates, the mountain is steep, and has cirques just like other lofty peaks in the Hidaka Mountains; containing Hachi no sawa Cirque (八ノ沢カール) in Tokachi Subprefecture side and Koiboku Cirque (コイボクカール) in Hidaka Subprefecture side. There also lie Moraines in downstream of those cirques. Those cirques in the Hidaka Mountains are smaller than ones in Hida Mountains region. The reason could be because in Ice age, around 20,000 years ago, snowfall was less when Japanese archipelago was connected to the continent by land and thus warm sea current, Tsushima Current was blocked from getting into Sea of Japan.

See also
 Hidaka Mountains
 Mount Satsunai（1,896m）
 Mount Tokachiporoshiri（1,846m）
 Hidaka-sanmyaku Erimo Quasi-National Park
 
 Shizunai River

Notes

External links

 国土地理院 地図閲覧サービス 2万5千分1地形図名： 札内川上流（夕張岳4号-4）
 日高山脈山岳センター（札内川園地内）

Kamuiekuuchikaushi
Shinhidaka, Hokkaido